Michael Cohrs (born 1956 in Midland, Michigan) is an American financier. He was  Co-head of Corporate and Investment Banking and head of Global Banking (which comprises the mergers and acquisitions, global capital markets, coverage, commercial banking and global transaction banking businesses) at Deutsche Bank. He was also a member of the Group Executive Committee and the Management Board. He retired from Deutsche Bank in September 2010.

Cohrs holds a B.A. from Harvard College (1979) and a M.B.A. from Harvard Business School (1981). In 1981 he started his career at Goldman Sachs in New York, and was sent to London in 1989. Between 1991 and 1995 he served as a Director at S. G. Warburg & Co.  He was recruited by Deutsche Bank and played a leading role in building its corporate and investment bank.

In November 2009 Cohrs was appointed an adjunct professor at Peking University in Beijing.

In 2011 Michael Cohrs was appointed by the Chancellor of the Exchequer to the Financial Policy Committee and by the British Crown to the Court (Board of Directors) at the Bank of England.

In January 2012 he was appointed as an advisor to EQT in Sweden.

References 
  
 Eisenhammer, John. "How the Mighty Warburgs has Fallen", The Independent on Sunday, February 10, 1996 https://www.independent.co.uk/news/business/how-is-the-mighty-warburg-fallen-1572402.html
 Armitstead, Louse.  "Investment Banker Hired to Spot Future Crises", The Daily Telegraph, February 18, 2011 https://www.telegraph.co.uk/finance/newsbysector/banksandfinance/8331213/Investment-banker-hired-to-spot-future-crises.html
  Jacqueline Simmons.  "Cohrs Set to Retire After Deutsche Bank Narrows M&A Gap With Goldman Sachs"  Bloomberg News, June 3, 2010
https://www.bloomberg.com/news/2010-06-03/cohrs-set-to-retire-after-deutsche-bank-narrows-m-a-gap-with-goldman-sachs.html

External links 
 The Deal Interview with Michael Cohrs, Die Welt is Flat by Vipal Monga
 The True Bosses of the Deutsche Bank by Gerd Zitzelsberger
  Wall Street Journal Deutsche Bank Moves Put CEO Hunt in Focus
  Deutsche Bank Appoints New Board Members
  Cohrs Jain Avoid Crises Losses
 Michael Cohrs Appointed Adjunct Professor
 HMT  Michael Cohrs appointed to the Court of the Bank of England
    Michael Cohrs Advisor to EQT

Living people
1956 births
People from Midland, Michigan
American bankers
Harvard College alumni
Harvard Business School alumni
Goldman Sachs people
People associated with the Bank of England